Rafael Gurrea Induráin (10 June 1940 – 23 February 2021) was a Spanish politician and member of the Navarrese People's Union (UPN). Gurrea served as
the Vice President of the Government of Navarre from 1996 to 2003 and the President of the Parliament of Navarre, the unicameral legislature of Navarre, from 18 June 2003 to 19 June 2007. He was also Vice President of the Navarrese People's Union (UPN) from 1997 until his death in 2021.

Rafael Gurrea Induráin died in Pamplona on 23 February 2021, at the age of 80. He was survived by his wife, Maria Pilar Mondurrey, and three children.

References

1940 births
2021 deaths
Presidents of the Parliament of Navarre
Members of the 1st Parliament of Navarre
Members of the 2nd Parliament of Navarre
Members of the 3rd Parliament of Navarre
Members of the 4th Parliament of Navarre
Members of the 5th Parliament of Navarre
Members of the 6th Parliament of Navarre
Members of the 7th Parliament of Navarre
Mayors of places in Navarre
Politicians from Navarre
Navarrese People's Union politicians
Union of the Democratic Centre (Spain) politicians